Doreen Hankin is an English international lawn and indoor bowler.

Bowls career
In 2005 she won the triples and fours gold medals at the Atlantic Bowls Championships.

Hankin has won two English National titles at the English National Bowls Championships winning the women's triples in 1994 and the women's fours in 2016. On both occasions this qualified her for the British Isles Bowls Championships and she subsequently won both events.

References

Living people
English female bowls players
Year of birth missing (living people)